A graded-index or gradient-index fiber is an optical fiber whose core has a refractive index that decreases with increasing radial distance from the optical axis of the fiber.

Because parts of the core closer to the fiber axis have a higher refractive index than the parts near the cladding, light rays follow sinusoidal paths down the fiber. The most common refractive index profile for a graded-index fiber is very nearly parabolic. The parabolic profile results in continual refocusing of the rays in the core, and minimizes modal dispersion.

Multi-mode optical fiber can be built with either graded index or step index. The advantage of the multi-mode graded index compared to the multi-mode step index is the considerable decrease in modal dispersion. Modal dispersion can be further decreased by selecting a smaller core size (less than 5–10 μm) and forming a single-mode step index fiber.

This type of fiber is normalized by the International Telecommunication Union ITU-T at recommendation G.651.1.

Pulse dispersion
Pulse dispersion in a graded index optical fiber is given by

where

 is the difference in refractive indices of core and cladding,

 is the refractive index of the cladding,

 is the length of the fiber taken for observing the pulse dispersion,

 is the speed of light, and

  is the constant of graded index profile.

See also
Power-law index profile
Gradient index optics

References

Optical fiber